Luke (Lucas) Hasegawa was a Japanese artist commissioned to do the murals remembering the 26 Martyrs of Nagasaki for the Church of the Holy Japanese Martyrs in Civitavecchia, Italy.

He is a graduate of Morning Star (Gyosei) International School in Tokyo.

His work is documented in a book titled Each with His Own Brush: Contemporary Christian Art in Asia and Africa by Daniel Johnson Fleming, published by Friendship Press in 1938.

External links
 "Introducción del Cristianismo en Japón" created in 1925 by Luke Hasegawa - Vatican Museum
 "Junco de Pesca Chino" by Luke Hasegawa
 "Mosaic of Mary HOC" by Luke Hasegawa

Year of birth missing
Year of death missing
Japanese painters
Japanese Christians